Sindi Simtowe (born 27 July 1987) is a Malawian netball player who plays for Malawi in the positions of goal attack or goal shooter. Sindi Simtowe has featured in three consecutive World Cup tournaments for Malawi in 2011, 2015 and in 2019. She has also represented Malawi at the Commonwealth Games in 2010, 2014 and in 2018.

She was also a key member of the Malawian team which clinched historic bronze medal at the 2016 Fast5 Netball World Series in Melbourne, defeating England in the third place playoff.

References 

1987 births
Living people
Malawian netball players
Netball players at the 2010 Commonwealth Games
Netball players at the 2014 Commonwealth Games
Netball players at the 2018 Commonwealth Games
Commonwealth Games competitors for Malawi
People from Karonga
2019 Netball World Cup players
2015 Netball World Cup players
2011 World Netball Championships players